Brawl in the Family may refer to:
"Brawl in the Family" (The Simpsons), an episode from The Simpsons
Brawl in the Family (webcomic)
"Brawl in the Family", an episode from The Loud House